Samyuktha Hegde is an Indian actress who predominantly works  in Kannada and Tamil films. She made her film debut with the Kannada film Kirik Party opposite Rakshit Shetty, directed by Rishab Shetty. She played the role named Arya, for which she won Filmfare Award for Best Supporting Actress – Kannada. She made her debut in Tamil language through Comali opposite Jayam Ravi and Kajal Agarwal. 

She also participated in reality shows MTV Roadies, Bigg Boss Kannada (2017) and MTV Splitsvilla, where she ended up as the first runner up (2018).

Early and personal life

Samyuktha was born in Bangalore to a Christian mother and a Hindu Brahmin father. Her native village is Kelaginamane, a place in the Uttara Kannada district. She did her schooling from St. Paul's English School. She discontinued her degree course in BA psychology and journalism in Jain University, Bangalore to continue pursuing dancing and acting.

Career

In 2016, Hegde was cast as a parallel female lead in Rakshit Shetty's comedy-drama Kirik Party. Impressed by her Facebook profile, the makers called her for an audition that she subsequently cleared. The film received critical acclaim and emerged a major commercial success. Hegde's performance playing the love interest of Shetty's character won praise for Hegde; a reviewer for The Times of India stated that "Samyuktha Hegde, as the bubbly Aarya, has a tough act to follow given the peppy first half and impresses by holding her own in crucial scenes", while The New Indian Express's reviewer felt that Hegde "outshone in the film along with the main character Karna".

In 2016, Hegde appeared as a contestant in the reality television show MTV Roadies. She said that being a part of the show had been her childhood dream. 

In October 2018, Hegde entered MTV Splitsvilla in its eleventh season as a wild card entrant and  became the Runner up of the season.

In 2019, she made her debut in Tamil film through Comali opposite to Jayam Ravi and Kajal Agarwal. Her role as Nikitha, was praised by all the audiences, though her role was minimum in the film. She learned Tamil language for the fim and dubbed on her own. After that she packed more films in Tamil film industries.

Filmography

Film

Television

Awards and nominations

References

External links
 

Living people
1998 births
21st-century Indian actresses
Actresses from Bangalore
Actresses in Kannada cinema
Bigg Boss Kannada contestants
Indian film actresses
MTV Roadies contestants